KIBG (100.7 FM) is a radio station broadcasting a variety hits format. Licensed to Bigfork, Montana, United States, the station serves the Kalispell-Flathead Valley area.  The station is currently owned by Anderson Radio Broadcasting, Inc.

History
The frequency was originally allotted to the community of Wallace, Idaho by the Federal Communications Commission as a first-come / first served radio channel. In 1996, Scott Parker's Alpine Broadcasting, Ltd. of Ketchum, Idaho filed an application for a construction permit, then built and licensed the station at Wallace. The original call letters were KSIL (1996-08-16), to represent "Silver" - given the area's silver mining history. Parker later moved the station to Bigfork, Montana and sold the station in 1999 to its current owner, Dennis Anderson's Anderson Radio Broadcasting, Inc. of Polson, Montana. On 2004-03-25 the station became the current KIBG.

References

External links

IBG
Adult hits radio stations in the United States
Radio stations established in 1996